Kinmuck,  Aberdeenshire, is a small village just outside Inverurie in the north-east of Scotland.

References

Villages in Aberdeenshire
Inverurie